Each winner of the 1967 Governor General's Awards for Literary Merit was selected by a panel of judges administered by the Canada Council for the Arts.

Winners

English Language
Poetry or Drama: Alden Nowlan, Bread, Wine and Salt.
Poetry or Drama: Eli Mandel, An Idiot Joy.
Non-Fiction: Norah Story, The Oxford Companion to Canadian History and Literature.

French Language
Fiction: Jacques Godbout, Salut Galarneau.
Poetry or Drama: Françoise Loranger, Encore cinq minutes.
Non-Fiction: Robert-Lionel Séguin, La civilisation traditionelle de l'"Habitant" aux XVII^e et XVIII^e siècles.

Governor General's Awards
Governor General's Awards
Governor General's Awards